Nephele may refer to:

 Nephele, a cloud nymph in Greek mythology
 Nephele (moth), a genus of moth
 431 Nephele, an asteroid
 "Nephele", a song by Animals as Leaders from the album The Joy of Motion, 2014

See also
 Nephelae, a play by Aristophanes